"Rescue" is the second single released by the band Echo & the Bunnymen. It was released on 5 May 1980 and subsequently included on the Crocodiles album, which was released on 18 July 1980. It was the band's first single to chart, reaching number 62 on the UK Singles Chart. It was also their first release on the newly formed Korova label.

On the single's release, Smash Hits described it as "attractive left field pop" that had "sparse guitaring reminiscent of early Cure and plenty of deadpan melodic bite".

The single was reissued as a limited edition 7" single on 4 December 2006 on the same label and with the same catalogue number, KOW 1, and reached number 177 on the UK Singles Chart. A promo 7" version was also released by Korova in January 1983.

The song was covered by the Scottish rock group Idlewild on the b-side of their 2000 single "These Wooden Ideas," and by the American band Rogue Wave on the 2016 album of 80s covers, Cover Me.

Formats and track listings
All tracks written by Will Sergeant, Ian McCulloch, Les Pattinson and Pete de Freitas.

1980 and 2006 7" single (KOW 1)
"Rescue"
"Simple Stuff"

1980 12" single (KOW 1T)
"Rescue"
"Simple Stuff"
"Pride"

1983 7" promo single (SAM271)
"Rescue"
"Never Stop"
"The Cutter"

Chart positions

References

External links
Live performance from the official website

1980 singles
2006 singles
Echo & the Bunnymen songs
Songs written by Ian McCulloch (singer)
Songs written by Will Sergeant
Songs written by Les Pattinson
Songs written by Pete de Freitas
Song recordings produced by Ian Broudie
1980 songs
Korova (record label) singles